People's Democratic Party or variant thereof, could refer to:

People's Democratic Party of Afghanistan
People's Democratic Party (Belize)
People's Democratic Party (Bhutan)
People's Democratic Party (Chile)
People's Democratic Party (Dominican Republic)
People's Democratic Party (Egypt)
People's Democratic Party (Fiji)
Peoples Democratic Party (India)
People's Democratic Party (Indonesia)
Peoples Democratic Party (Kenya)
People's Democratic Party of Liberia
People's Democratic Party (Macedonia)
People's Democratic Party (Nigeria)
People's Democratic Party (Serbia)
People's Democratic Party (Sierra Leone)
People's Democratic Party (South Korea)
People's Democratic Party (Spain), 1982–1989
People's Democratic Party (Spain, 1974)
People's Democratic Party (Sudan)
People's Democratic Party of Tajikistan
People's Democratic Party (Taiwan)
People's Democratic Party (Tonga)
People's Democratic Party (Transnistria) or Proriv
People's Democratic Party (Trinidad and Tobago)
Peoples' Democratic Party (Turkey)
People's Democratic Party (Ukraine)
People's Democratic Party of Uzbekistan
People's Democratic Party (Zimbabwe)
Eelam People's Democratic Party, Sri Lanka
Jammu and Kashmir Peoples Democratic Party, India

See also
Democratic People's Party (disambiguation)
Democratic Party (disambiguation)
People's Party (disambiguation)